Michelsen is a Danish-Norwegian patronymic surname meaning "son of Mikkel/Michael". There are related English, German, Swedish and other spellings of this name.  People with the name Michelsen include:

People
Albert Michelsen (1893-1964), American marathoner
Alfonso López Michelsen (1913- 2007), Colombian politician, lawyer and journalist
Anders Michelsen, Norwegian football midfielder 
Andreas Michelsen (1869-1932), German admiral
Anne Dorte Michelsen, Danish singer and composer
Charis Michelsen, American actress and former model
Christian Michelsen (1857–1925), Norwegian shipping magnate and statesman 
Christian Michelsen (footballer), Norwegian footballer who currently plays for Kristiansund BK 
Hans Methlie Michelsen,  Norwegian judge 
Jacob Andreas Michelsen (1821–1902),  Norwegian businessperson and politician 
Lars-Henrik Paarup Michelsen, Norwegian Representative to Parliament, president of Young Liberals of Norway 
Randi Michelsen (1903 1981),  Danish film actress 
Stacey Michelsen (born 1991), New Zealand field hockey player
Thomas Michelsen, Norwegian football midfielder 
Thore Michelsen (1888 –1980), Norwegian rower who competed in the 1920 Summer Olympics

Other
Michelsen Farmstead, Canadian Provincial Historic Site 
Michelsen Island, South Orkney Islands, Antarctica
Michelsen's Cabinet, Norwegian coalition cabinet, which governed Norway between 1905 and 1907

See also
 Michaelson
 Michelson (disambiguation)
 Mickelson
 Michaelsen
 Mikkelsen

Danish-language surnames
Norwegian-language surnames
Patronymic surnames
Surnames from given names